Cerro Vicuña Mackenna is the highest point in the Sierra Vicuña Mackenna and the Chilean Coast Ranges. The peak has a stark desert climate, typical of the Atacama Desert. The peak is named after Benjamín Vicuña Mackenna.

References

Landforms of Antofagasta Region
Vicuna Mackenna